Ibrahim Salem Mohammedin (إبراهيم سالم محمدين; September 15, 1921 – November 12, 2018) was an Egyptian engineer and industrialist. Mohammedin served as the Minister of Industry from 1973 until 1974 under President Anwar Sadat. 

In 1982, Mohammedin founded the Alexandria National Iron and Steel Company (now known as Ezz Steel) and served as its chairman from 1982 to 2001. He stepped down as chairman in 2001 and was succeeded by Ahmed Ezz.

Mohammedin was born in Damietta Governorate, Egypt, on September 15, 1921. He died in Cairo from an illness on November 12, 2018, at the age of 97.

References

1921 births
2018 deaths
Trade and Industry ministers of Egypt
Egyptian chief executives
Egyptian business executives
People from Damietta Governorate